The New Firm can refer to at least two major football rivalries:
New Firm (Denmark) - F.C. Copenhagen v Brøndby IF (Denmark)
New Firm (Scotland) - Aberdeen F.C. v Dundee United F.C. (Scotland)